Roseland Waterpark is a  water park in the Finger Lakes region of Upstate New York. Bristol Mountain owns the waterpark.

It is located at 250 Eastern Boulevard in Canandaigua, New York.

External links
 
Bristol Mountain Resort

Water parks in New York (state)
Buildings and structures in Ontario County, New York
Tourist attractions in Ontario County, New York